Notocochlis guesti is a species of predatory sea snail, a marine gastropod mollusk in the family Naticidae, the moon snails.

Distribution
Locus typicus: St. Martin, Lesser Antilles.

This species occurs in the Gulf of Mexico, the Caribbean Sea and the Lesser Antilles.

Description 
The maximum recorded shell length is 33 mm.

Habitat 
Minimum recorded depth is 165 m. Maximum recorded depth is 421 m.

References

 Rosenberg, G., F. Moretzsohn, and E. F. García. 2009. Gastropoda (Mollusca) of the Gulf of Mexico, Pp. 579–699 in Felder, D.L. and D.K. Camp (eds.), Gulf of Mexico–Origins, Waters, and Biota. Biodiversity. Texas A&M Press, College Station, Texas.
 Costa P.M.S. & Pastorino G. (2012) New Naticidae (Gastropoda) from Brazil. The Nautilus 126(1): 25–32

guesti
Gastropods described in 1984